Kushuhum or Kushugum is an urban-type settlement in the Zaporizhzhia Raion (district) of Zaporizhzhia Oblast in southern Ukraine. Kushuhum hosts the administration of Kushuhum settlement hromada, one of the hromadas of Ukraine.  Population: . In 2001, its population was 5,668 according to the census, Kushuhum is the administrative center of the Kushuhum Council, a local government area.

The settlement was first founded in 1770 as the village of Velyka Katerynivka. In 1938, it was renamed to Kushuhum and given the status of an urban-type settlement. It is located on the left bank of the Kakhovka Reservoir.

References

External links
 

Zaporizhzhia Raion
Urban-type settlements in Zaporizhzhia Raion
Populated places established in 1770
1770 establishments in the Russian Empire
Populated places on the Dnieper in Ukraine